The phoenix has provided the name for a number of locations, including cities and towns, and notable structures. Following is a list of places named for the phoenix.

 United States
 Phoenix, Arizona
 Phoenix, Illinois
 Phoenix, Louisiana
 Phoenix, Maryland
 Phoenix, Michigan
 Phoenix, New York
 Phoenix, Oregon
 Phoenixville, Pennsylvania

  Other countries
 Vacoas-Phoenix, Mauritius
 Phoenix, Durban, South Africa
 Phoenix Islands, Kiribati
 Phoenix Park, Dublin, Ireland
 Phoenix Concert Theatre, Toronto, Canada
 Phoenix Cinema, London, England
 Phoenix, British Columbia, Canada
 La Fenice (The Phoenix), an opera house in Venice, Italy
 Camp Phoenix, US Army military camp located in Kabul, Afghanistan

See also
 Phoenix (disambiguation)